Arabidopsis arenosa, the sand rock-cress, is a species of flowering plant in the family Brassicaceae. It is found mostly in Central Europe in both a diploid and an autotetraploid form. This sets it apart from the other, mostly diploid, Arabidopsis species including the closely related Arabidopsis lyrata or Arabidopsis thaliana, the model plant species.

References

Bibliography

arenosa
Plants described in 1753
Taxa named by Carl Linnaeus